Hawawshi (sometimes spelled hawwaoshi;) is a traditional Egyptian dish. It is a pita stuffed with minced meat and spiced with onions, pepper, parsley, and occasionally chilies. The major variants of hawawshi are "baladi" (standard) and Alexandrian. In most of Egypt, it is baked by filling the flat Egyptian bread with the meat mix and then baking it in the oven. In Alexandria, the ingredients are placed between two circular layers of dough, then baked in an oven. Alexandrian hawawshi also usually have different spices and seasonings. Hawawshi has spread to other countries in the Middle East and North Africa with some variation. In the Levant, it is made using saj bread and includes hot peppers in the filling. In Algeria, it is known as "muhajib" and is eaten with soup or a yoghurt salad.

Hawawshi is commonly made in Egyptian homes and is also served in some restaurants, usually as a take-away. Prices at restaurants range from £E10 to 30, depending on the size and amount of meat used.

History
Hawawshi was invented in 1971 by an Egyptian butcher named Ahmed al-Hawawsh  . From his stall in the Souk Al-Tawfik neighborhood in Cairo, hawawshi spread throughout Cairo and then to the rest of Egypt. Since al-Hawawsh's death, hawawshi have become especially popular in Sharqia Governorate in the Nile Delta, where the best hawawshi are reported to be found.

See also
 Sambusa, the Ethiopian equivalent
 Fatayer, the Lebanese equivalent
 List of Middle Eastern dishes
 Cornish pasty

References

Arab cuisine
Egyptian cuisine
Middle Eastern cuisine